is a tram station in Kōchi, Japan.It is only 63 meters from the neighboring Seiwagakuen-mae Station, which is the shortest distance between adjacent stations in Japan.

Lines
Tosa Electric Railway
Gomen Line

Adjacent stations

|-
!colspan=5|Tosa Electric Railway

Railway stations in Kōchi Prefecture
Railway stations in Japan opened in 1911